Kattankudy (also transliterated as "Kathankudy") is a township near the city of Batticaloa on the eastern coast of Sri Lanka. The town is predominantly populated by Muslims.

Most of the people are engaged in business, industries and fisheries. The division of Kattankudy occupies the central part of the district.

Boundaries 

North :   Manmunai North Divisional secretariat.

East :   Bay of Bengal (Sea).

South :   Manmunaipattu Divisional Secretariat.

West :   Batticaloa Lagoon.

Demographics 

Kattankudy is one of the many Moorish(Muslims)-dominated towns in Sri Lanka. 

{| class="wikitable"
|+ align=top| 'Ethnicity in Kattankudy Urban Council  
|+
|-
!Ethnicity!!Population!!% of Total
|-
|Moors||40,124||98.01
|-
|Indian Tamils||153  ||0.80
|-
|Sinhalese||36||0.05
|-
|Sri Lankan Tamils||20||0.02
|-
|Other (including Burgher, Malay)||23||0.02
|-
|Total||40,356||100
|}Source:''statistics.gov. lk

GS Divisions and Population (2014) 

Source: http://www.kattankudy.ds.gov.lk

Kattankudy Mosque Massacre 

Kattankudy Mosque Massacre was the killing of over 147 Muslim men and boys in a Mosque in Kattankudy by armed persons on 3 August 1990. It took place when around 30 armed persons raided four mosques in the town of Kattankudy, where over 300 people were prostrating in Isha prayers. The attack is attributed to LTTE by the Sri Lankan Government, although the former denied their involvement in the massacre, and have never retracted that denial.  The initial report put the death toll at around 100, but as many of the injured who were rushed to hospital succumbed to their injuries, the final death toll rose to over 147.

Tsunami 2004 
When the 2004 tsunami hit, approximately 108 people died in Kattankudy and 93 persons are still listed as missing. Around 2,500 houses were damaged by the tsunami in Kattankudy.

See also 
 Kattankudy mosque massacre
 Kattankudi Urban Council
 Kattankudy Central College

References 

Towns in Batticaloa District
Kattankudy DS Division